The 71st Airborne Brigade was an airborne brigade of the United States Army and the Texas Army National Guard. The brigade was active from 15 January 1968 until 1 November 1973.

The formation traces its history to the 71st Infantry Brigade of the 36th Division in World War I, when it had the 141st and 142nd Infantry Regiments, along with the 132nd Machine Gun Battalion, assigned.

The 71st Airborne Brigade consisted of three airborne infantry battalions:
 1st Battalion (Airborne), 143d Infantry
 2nd Battalion (Airborne), 143d Infantry
 3rd Battalion (Airborne), 143d Infantry

These infantry battalions were supported by an airborne field artillery unit headquartered in Port Arthur, Texas:
 1st Battalion (Airborne), 133d Field Artillery

The 71st Airborne Brigade (separate) and its successor 36th Airborne Brigade reinforced the 82nd Airborne Division as a 4th Brigade.  All 3,300 troopers of the 71st Brigade were authorized to be jump-qualified. On 1 November 1973, the brigade was inactivated and a reduced amount of its personnel and equipment were used to activate the 36th Airborne Brigade, a TDA headquarters. The brigade only had two battalions: 1-143d and 2-143d. On 1 April 1980 the brigade was inactivated and the two battalions were reorganized and reflagged as other types of units. Company A of 2-143d formed Company G (Ranger), 143d Infantry, a corps-level LRRP unit (later LRS) that remained active until 2001.

The brigade's lineage lives on today, embodied in the 71st Battlefield Surveillance Brigade.

See also

References

71
71